Phortica variegata (also known as the "variegated fruit fly") is a species of vinegar fly in the family Drosophilidae. Phortica and related fly species are perhaps best known for their behaviour of feeding on the lacrimal secretions of mammals (mammalian tear duct secretions). As a consequence of this behaviour, P. variegata can serve as a vector of Thelazia callipaeda roundworms. 

The species was first described as Amiota variegata (Fallén, 1823), but has since been clarified as a member of the Phortica genus.

References 

Drosophilidae